

Group A

Head coach:  Comunardo Niccolai

Head coach:  Brian Hughes

Head coach:  Humberto Redes Filho

Head coach:  Taha Basry

Group B

Head coach:  Roger Koffi

Head coach:  Kim Sam-Rak

Head coach:  Roy Rees

Head coach:  Eduardo Macias Villegas

Group C

Head coach:  José de Souza Teixeira

Head coach:  Jean-Pierre Morlans

Head coach:  Mohammed Al-Kharashy

Head coach:  Vic Dalgleish

Group D

Head coach:  Aleksandr Piskaryov

Head coach:  Sebastian Brodrick-Imasuen

 Nigerian players were selected from school teams.

Head coach:  Jesús Del Muro

Head coach:  Eduardo Rivero Aviles

References

Fifa U-16 World Championship Squads, 1987
FIFA U-17 World Cup squads